Shattered Mirror is a novel by Amelia Atwater-Rhodes.

Shattered Mirror may also refer to:

 Shattered Mirror (Star Trek: Deep Space Nine), a fourth-season episode
Shattered Mirror, a Nollywood film with Ngozi Ezeonu
"Shattered Mirror", a 1993 Mills & Boon novel by Kate Walker (writer)
Badger: Shattered Mirror, a miniseries featuring Badger (comics)

See also
Shattered Glass (disambiguation)